Paralomis zealandica, also known as the prickly king crab, is a species of king crab which lives at a depth of  in New Zealand. It has spiky carapace. The scientific name of the species was first validly published in 1971 by Dawson & Yaldwyn. P. zealandica can be distinguished from other species in New Zealand waters by its thick covering of strong upright spines all over, including on its abdomen and along its legs and claws. The rostrum has three short, strong and sharp spines. It is the most prominent species of Paralomis in New Zealand.

See also 
 Paralomis debodeorum, an extinct species which closely resembles P. zealandica

References

King crabs
Crustaceans described in 1971
Marine crustaceans of New Zealand